Jang Young-nam (born November 25, 1973) is a South Korean actress. She began her career as an acclaimed actress in theater, then transitioned to supporting roles on television and film, notably in works by director Jang Jin.  A member of Jang Jin's Division 장진사단, she regularly appears in his films and theater company productions. She became one of the original cast members of the live sketch comedy show Saturday Night Live Korea when Jang Jin brought the American show to South Korea. In addition, she was a member of the Korean theater troupe Mokhwa Repertory Company.

She is known for her skill in both comedic and dramatic roles and her ability to easily transition between different genres and mediums such as theater, television and films. Some notable supporting film roles include A Werewolf Boy and Hello Ghost. She has also made memorable cameos in dramas, Pinocchio and Moon Embracing the Sun.  In 2013, she played her first onscreen leading role in the revenge crime thriller Azooma, which won her the Best Actress Award from the Director's Guild at the 17th Busan International Film Festival (BIFF).

Personal life 
In December 2011, she married a theater director and film university professor Lee Ho-ung who is seven years younger. She and her husband have a son born in 2014.

Filmography

Film

TV movies

Television series

Web series

Variety show

Theater

Awards and nominations

References

External links

 
 
 
 Jang Young-nam at Daum
 Jang Young-nam at BH Entertainment (Management Agency)

South Korean stage actresses
South Korean film actresses
South Korean television actresses
Seoul Institute of the Arts alumni
1973 births
People from Seoul
Living people
20th-century South Korean actresses
21st-century South Korean actresses